Hard Rock Zombies is a 1985 American comedy horror film directed and co-written by Krishna Shah, and starring E.J. Curse, Geno Andrews, Sam Mann, Mick McMains, Lisa Toothman, Jennifer Coe, Ted Wells, and Jack Bliesener. The film was released by Cannon Film Distributors on September 1985.

Plot
A heavy-metal band must do a performance to impress a record company scout.  They do a concert in a town that outlaws rock and roll music.  The town counsel is influenced by a murderous Nazi cult. The band is slain by the cult, but later returned to life as zombies by a song recording that the bass player wrote using medieval spell book lyrics. Fresh out of the grave, the band thirsts to take their revenge and give a new music performance. The mysterious song causes an outbreak of zombie ghouls.

Cast
E.J. Curse as Jessie
Geno Andrews 
Sam Mann as Bobby
Mick McMains
Lisa Toothman as Elsa
Jennifer Coe as Cassie
Ted Wells as Ron
Jack Bliesener as Adolf Hitler
Richard Vidan as Sheriff
Phil Fondacaro as Mickey
Crystal Shaw Martell as Mrs. Buff
Vincent De Stefano as Olaf
Gary Friedkin as Buckey
Christopher Perkins as Christian
Michael David Simms as Don Matson
Nadia as Eva
Susan Prevatte as Wolf Lady
Emmanuel Shipov as Grandfather
Stacy Stockman as Lu-Ann
David O'Hara as Ed
Jonathan King as Red
Donald Moran as Ted
David Schroeder as Cassie's Father
John Drake as Old Man / Ancient Man
Maria Porter as Maria
John Fleck as Arnold

Production
The film was made in 1983 at the same time as American Drive-In and featured as the drive-in movie within that film.

Release
Hard Rock Zombies was released in 1985.

Home media
Hard Rock Zombies was released on blu-ray by Vinegar Syndrome as part of a two-disk set with Slaughterhouse Rock.

References

External links

1980s comedy horror films
1985 horror films
1985 films
American comedy horror films
American zombie comedy films
Nazi zombie films
1985 comedy films
1980s English-language films
1980s American films